The politics of Franche-Comté, France takes place in a framework of a presidential representative democracy, whereby the President of Regional Council is the head of government, and of a pluriform multi-party system. Legislative power is vested in the regional council.

Executive
The executive of the region is led by the President of the regional council.

List of presidents

Legislative branch

The Regional Council of Franche-Comté (Conseil régional de Franche-Comté) is composed of 43 councillors, elected by proportional representation in a two-round system. The winning list in the second round is automatically entitled to a quarter of the seats. The remainder of the seats are allocated through proportional representation with a 5% threshold.

The Council is elected for a six-year term.

Current composition

Elections

Other elections

In the 2007 legislative election, the UMP won 11 seats and the Socialist Party won two seats.

References

External links
Franche-Comté Region